CDT is an Australian digital television station broadcasting in remote central and eastern Australia. It is jointly owned by Southern Cross Austereo (owner of Southern Cross Central) and Imparja Television Pty Ltd (owner of Imparja Television) and operates under the company name Central Digital Television.

The station is available via satellite and terrestrial platforms and free-to-air on a number of digital terrestrial transmitters, in remote areas of Australia.

The station is similar to other joint venture services already available in Tasmania, Mildura, Darwin and Western Australia. Officially, the service's call sign is CDT in the Remote Central and Eastern Australia TV2 licence areas, and IDQ in the Mount Isa TV1 licence area (reflecting the status of existing Southern Cross Television station ITQ).

History 
Central Digital Television began broadcasting Ten Central, One HD and One SD as digital satellite channels on 30 June 2010, the same day as the Viewer Access Satellite Television service was partially launched. Southern Cross Central and Imparja Television also commenced broadcasting digital satellite channels on the same day. The launch of the commercial digital channels coincided with the first analog television transmitter switch off in Mildura, Victoria. This was so viewers in the area who lost adequate television coverage were able to utilise VAST as an alternative source.

On 10 December 2010, VAST officially launched and began granting access to viewers in the Remote Central and Eastern Australia licence areas. This brought digital television to satellite viewers in the Northern Territory, Queensland and South Australia for the first time. Digital terrestrial transmissions began in Alice Springs, Northern Territory and Mount Isa, Queensland on 2 May 2011, with other areas launching between 2012 and 2013.

Programming 
CDT is affiliated to Network 10, but sources programming from two stations. 10 Central North is based on TVQ Brisbane, and airs 10 News First: Queensland from Brisbane nightly at 5pm, as well as sport, weather and events in the Brisbane area. 10 Central South, 10 Bold and 10 Peach are taken from TEN Sydney, including sport, weather and events from 10 News First: New South Wales in Sydney. Both Ten Central channels also air programming produced by Southern Cross 10. TVSN has the same programming in every region across the country.

Previously they broadcast Network 10 programming across their primary and multi channels, through 10 Central North relaying the Melbourne feed of ATV while 10 Central South continued to relay the Adelaide feed of ADS, the stations had also carried the Melbourne and Adelaide schedules of Eleven and One through their secondary services.

News and current affairs

CDT and IDQ simulcasts the weekday edition of 10 News First from TVQ-10 in Brisbane (north) and TEN-10 in Sydney (south) along with the weekend edition from TEN-10 in both areas.
10 News First: Queensland (Monday to Friday 5:00pm – 6:30pm for north remote viewers) (from TVQ-10)
10 News First: New South Wales (Monday to Friday 5:00pm – 6:30pm for south remote viewers) (from TEN-10)
10 News First: Weekend (Saturday 5:00pm – 6:00pm and Sunday 5:30pm – 6:30pm for both north and south remote viewers) (from TEN-10)

Availability

Terrestrial 
Central Digital Television broadcasts free-to-air digital television channels Ten Central, One and Eleven via terrestrial transmissions in many regional cities and towns. The service is licensed to broadcast within the Remote Central and Eastern Australia TV2 and Mt Isa TV1 licence areas, which include Alice Springs, Bourke, Ceduna, Charleville, Coober Pedy, Cooktown, Katherine, Longreach, Mount Isa, Roma and Weipa, as well as others.

Satellite 
A digital satellite transmission of CDT's channels is available free-to-view on the VAST service in all states and territories of Australia, except Western Australia. 10 Bold is broadcast as a single high definition channel to all viewers, while 10 Central and 10 Peach are each split into two separate standard-definition channels. 10 Central North and 10 Peach North are broadcast in Australian Eastern Standard Time for viewers in Northern Territory and Queensland (Northern Australia TV3 licence area), and 10 Central South and 10 Peach South in Australian Eastern Summer Time for viewers in New South Wales, Victoria, South Australia, Tasmania and Norfolk Island (South Eastern Australia TV3 licence area).

See also
 Network 10
 Seven Central
 Imparja Television

References

External links 
 Central Digital Television
 Southern Cross Austereo

Joint ventures
Digital terrestrial television in Australia
Television channels and stations established in 2011